The Bahlui is the largest river of the city of Iași, in eastern Romania. It is a right tributary of the river Jijia. Its name is derived from Cuman and it means "muddy river". The Bahlui has a length of 119 km and a catchment area of 1967 km². The average discharge is about 4.88 m³/s.

Its spring is located at an altitude of 500 metres in the Tudora Comune, Botoșani County, in the eastern part of Suceava Plateau. It flows through the Jijia Plain, from north-west toward south-east and through the cities of Hârlău (formerly named after the river: Târgul Bahluiului)  and Iași. It flows into the Jijia in Tomești, east of Iași. The quality of its waters is rather low, due to spills of industrial plants, especially in Iași. The Pârcovaci and Tansa-Belcești reservoirs are located on the river Bahlui.

Tributaries
The following rivers are tributaries to the river Bahlui (from source to mouth):

Left: Bahluiul Mic, Vulpoiul, Gurguiata, Lungul, Durușca, Totoești, Hoisești, Ileana, Bogonos, Lupul, Rediu, Cacaina, Ciric, Chirița, Orzeni

Right: Valea Mare, Valea Cetățuiei, Buhalnița, Măgura, Putina, Bahlueț, Voinești, Pârâul Mare, Nicolina, Vămășoaia

References

 
Rivers of Romania
Rivers of Botoșani County
Rivers of Iași County